North Brewham Meadows is an 8.9 hectare (21.9 acre) biological Site of Special Scientific Interest at North Brewham in Somerset, England, notified in 1987.

These traditionally-managed species-rich meadows support a neutral grassland community of the nationally rare common knapweed crested dog's-tail type. Breeding butterflies typical of unimproved neutral grassland include small copper (Lycaena phaeas), meadow brown (Maniola jurtina), grayling (Hipparchia semele) and ringlet (Aphantopus hyperantus).

References 

Sites of Special Scientific Interest in Somerset
Sites of Special Scientific Interest notified in 1987
Neutral grassland Sites of Special Scientific Interest
Meadows in Somerset